Fred L. Pincus (born September 6, 1942 in New York City, New York) is an American sociologist and emeritus professor of sociology at the University of Maryland—Baltimore County, where he taught for 44 years. He is known for researching claims of reverse discrimination by whites and males.

Education and career
Pincus received his degrees from the University of California, Los Angeles (B.A., 1964; M.A., 1967; Ph.D., 1969). He originally joined the University of Maryland faculty in 1968, and retired at the end of the 2012 spring semester.

Pincus is on the board of directors of the Research Associates Foundation, a Baltimore-based foundation that awards mini-grants to local activist groups and individuals.  He is also Co-President of the Baltimore Jewish Cultural Chavurah, a secular Jewish community that is affiliated with the Society for Humanistic Judaism.

Published works
Pincus wrote extensively.
Books and Monographs
Fred L Pincus (2020), Confessions of a Radical Academic: A Memoir. New York: Adelaide Books, 
Fred L Pincus (2011) Understanding Diversity: An Introduction to Class, Race, Gender, Sexual Orientation and Disability, 2nd Edition. Boulder, CO: Lynne Rienner Publishers,.
Fred L Pincus (2003), Reverse Discrimination: Dismantling the Myth. Boulder,CO: Lynne Rienner Publishers, 
 
 
 
Articles
Understanding Diversity: An Introduction 3rd Edition, co-authored with Bryan R. Ellis.  Boulder, CO: Lynne Rienner Publishers, 2021.
Affirmative Action: Not the Harsh Impact on Whites That Some Assume (2021)

References

External links

Living people
1942 births
American sociologists
University of Maryland, Baltimore County faculty
University of California, Los Angeles alumni
Academics from New York (state)